Dissen am Teutoburger Wald is an old charactered town in the district of Osnabrück, in Lower Saxony, Germany. It is situated in the Teutoburg Forest, approximately 20 km southeast of Osnabrück.

Geography
Dissen is located on the southern slope of the Teutoburg Forest at the transition to East Westphalia. The highest point is the Hankenüll (307 meters) on the northeastern city limits. From east to west is the city area about eight kilometers, from north to south about ten kilometers. The land use is composed as follows: 43.8 percent agricultural use, 41.7 percent forest area, 9.8 percent building and courtyard areas and 4.7 percent traffic and other areas.

Dissen is bordered to the north by Hilter and Melle, to the west by Bad Rothenfelde, and to the south and east by the North Rhine-Westphalian towns of Versmold and Borgholzhausen in the Gütersloh district.

The city consists of the districts Dissen, Aschen, Erpen, and Nolle.

History
Dissen was first mentioned in documents in 822, when Louis the Pious handed over the Meierhof in Dissen to the Bishop of Osnabrück. Since when the place exists is not known.

A public school with three classes was founded in 1857. In April 1832, a major fire destroyed 32 buildings, 200 people lost their roof over their heads. On November 8, 1951 Dissen received the city rights. The name "Dissen am Teutoburger Wald" was officially ordered by the Lower Saxony Ministry of the Interior with effect from 1 January 1976. Since 1 March 2005 Dissen has a full-time mayor. Since May 26, 2019 Eugen Görlitz (CDU) is mayor.

Origin of the place name

Old names of the place are 1217, 1284, 1325 (de) Disne, 1223, 1282, 1402, 1412, 1442, 1456/58, 1463, 1556, (after 1605) (de) Dissen, 1225 (in) Dyssene, (approx 1240) Dissene, 1246 (de) Dissenen, 1271 (de) Dissine, 1279 (in) Dhissene, 1402 Dyssen, 1412 Dyssen, 16th c. Dyssen and 1565 Dissenn. Difficult, perhaps too low-German hazy in a form Disina "misty, hazy area", perhaps referring to the moorland at Dissener Bach. Or maybe as Desina> Dissen to North Germanic anord. of the "haystack, ëschober", norw. desja "small pile", which was also borrowed in English. Then about hill town. Hard to solve so far.

Incorporations
On April 1, 1974, there was an area exchange between the city of Dissen and the neighboring community Bad Rothenfelde, in which Dissen gained a little more than 100 inhabitants, but also ceded nearly 600 inhabitants.

Population development

Politics
City Council

The following table shows the municipal election results since 1996.

Mayors
 Georg Majerski (2005-2011)
 Hartmut Nümann (2011-2019)
 Eugen Görlitz  (2019-Incumbent)

Coat of arms 
Blazon: In green under a golden crown a golden wheel.

Twin towns and sister cities 
  Dissen-Striesow, Landkreis Spree-Neiße, Brandenburg
  Gudensberg, Schwalm-Eder-Kreis, Hesse
  Thum, Erzgebirgskreis, Saxony

Main sights 

Fernmeldeturm Dissen (with viewing platform)
 Frommenhof
St. Mauritius (Dissen) (13. century)

Notable people 
 Hermann Heinrich Grafe (1818–1869), founder of the League of Free Evangelical Churches in Germany
 Christoph Friedrich Kurlbaum (1833–nach 1890), businessman and member of the parliament
 Erich Goudefroy (1880–1960), President of the Reichsbahn directorate Mainz and Altona
 Marianne Brentzel (* 1943), Author
 Gerda Krämer (* 1945), Politician (SPD)
 Klaus Feldmann (* 1950), General
 Rainer Spiering (* 1956), Politician (CDU)
 Andy Grote (* 1968), Politician (SPD)
 Marco Heggen (* 1970), Musician
 Gerwald Claus-Brunner (1972–2016), Politician (Pirates)

References

External links

Osnabrück (district)